The Internet in Botswana is used by about 28.4% of the population. This is slightly lower than the figure of 28.6% for Africa as a whole in 2015.

Statistics

 Internet top-level domain: .bw
 Internet users:
323,368 users, 15% of the population (2013).
 241,272 users, 148th in the world; 11.5% of the population, 166th in the world (2012);
 120,000 users, 154th in the world (2009);
   80,000 users (2007).

 Internet broadband:
 16,407 fixed broadband subscriptions, 134th in the world; 0.8% of the population, 143rd in the world;
 348,124 wireless broadband subscriptions, 102nd in the world; 16.6% of the population, 76th in the world.
 Internet hosts:
 1,806 hosts (2012);
 6,374 hosts (2008).
 Internet IPv4 addresses: 100,096 addresses allocated, less than 0.05% of the world total, 47.7 addresses per 1000 people (2012).
 Internet Service Providers:
 53 ISPs (2020);
 11 ISPs (2001);
   2 ISPs (1999).

ADSL

Botswana Telecom rolled out ADSL in early 2006. Current residential ADSL offerings include speeds from 512 kbit/s to 4096 kbit/s with prices from 292 to 863 BWP (~32 to ~97 US$).

ADSL has been introduced in the following areas:
Gaborone, Tlokweng, Mogoditshane, Molepolole, Phakalane, Francistown, Lobatse, Palapye, Maun, Kasane, Selibe-Phikwe, Letlhakane, Jwaneng, and Orapa.

Internet censorship and surveillance

There are no government restrictions on access to the Internet or credible reports the government monitors e-mail or Internet chat rooms.
The constitution and law provide for freedom of speech and press and the government generally respects these rights. The constitution and law prohibit arbitrary interference with privacy, family, home, correspondence, or browsing pornographic websites, and the government generally respects these prohibitions in practice.

See also

 Botswana
 Botswana Internet Exchange
Botswana Communications Regulatory Authority
 Media of Botswana
 Telecommunications in Botswana

References

External links
 Botswana Communications Regulatory Authority (BOCRA).
 "Botswana", Africa south of the Sahara: Selected Internet resources, Stanford University Libraries.
 "Computer and Internet Use Among Families: A Case of Botswana", Rama Srivastava and Ishaan Srivastava, BVICAM’S International Journal of Information Technology (New Delhi, 2008).